The .375/303 Westley Richards Accelerated Express, also known as the .375/303 Axite, is an obsolete medium bore rifle cartridge.

It was a high velocity, rimmed, bottlenecked cartridge. It was loaded with Axite, a new smokeless powder developed by Kynoch and said by them to be "comparatively free from erosion and corrosion effects". The cartridge's power was considered about the same as the .300 H&H Magnum.

Overview
The .375/303 Westley Richards Accelerated Express was designed by Westley Richards and introduced in 1905, being listed in Westley Richards' catalogues for several years thereafter. In 1909 it was also listed in Charles Lancaster & Co's catalogue and the Webley &  Scott  trade catalogue of 1914. The cartridge was chambered in double rifles with Lancaster oval-bore rifling, as well as single shot falling block rifles and in Lee-action magazine rifles manufactured by both Westley Richards and Lancaster.

The inclusion of ".375" in the cartridge's name leads to some confusion, but a comparison of case base diameters suggest it refers to the older .375 Flanged NE 2, a naming consistent with other British hunting cartridges of the era such as the .450/400 Nitro Express, .577/500 Nitro Express, etc. Since .375 Flanged NE is itself a necked-up and lengthened .303 British, .375/303 appears to be its second-generation derivative.

Upon its introduction the .375/303 Westley Richards Accelerated Express was considered one of the highest velocity cartridges available. This attracted military attention and in 1906 it was demonstrated to officials from the War Office and Admiralty, as well as representatives from the Japanese, Russian, Italian and other governments.

The case length is given as   total length  inches, with a spire point bullet. An Axite charge of 44.5 grains behind a 215 grain bullet, giving a pressure of 18 tons per square inch.

The cartridge did not have a long life because in 1907 British authorities banned military-calibre rifles in India and Sudan. It was superseded by the more powerful .318 Westley Richards in Westley Richards catalogues from 1910.

See also
 8×60mm S
 List of rifle cartridges

References

External links
 Imperial War Museums, "7.7 x 63.4R: Kynoch; .375/303 Westley Richards Accelerated Extress (Axite)", iwm.org.uk, retrieved 14 June 2018.
 Imperial War Museums, "7.7 x 63.4R : Kings Norton ; .375/.303 Axite Westley Richards Accelerated Express", iwm.org.uk
 Royal Armouries, "Centrefire rifle proof cartridge - .375/.303 in Axite by Eley", collections.royalarmouries.org, retrieved 15 June 2018.
 Royal Armouries, "Centrefire rifle cartridge - .375-303 in Axite by Kynoch", collections.royalarmouries.org, retrieved 15 June 2018.

Pistol and rifle cartridges
British firearm cartridges
Westley Richards cartridges
Weapons and ammunition introduced in 1905